Tim Roth is an English actor. He was nominated for the Academy Award for Best Supporting Actor for his role in Rob Roy.

Film

Television

Video games

References

External Links
 

Male actor filmographies
British filmographies